469705 ǂKá̦gára (provisional designation ) is a trans-Neptunian object and binary system of the core Kuiper belt, located in the outermost region of the Solar System. It was discovered on 11 March 2005 by American astronomer Marc Buie at the Kitt Peak Observatory in Arizona. Its 120-kilometer (75-mile) companion ǃHãunu was discovered with the Hubble Space Telescope in 2009. The ǂKá̦gára–ǃHãunu system is currently undergoing mutual occultation and eclipsing events in which one body casts a shadow on or obstructs the view of the other as seen from Earth.

Names 

The names ǂKá̦gára and ǃHãunu are from the mythology of the ǀXam people of South Africa. ǂKá̦gára (also rendered ǂKaʻgara) and his brother-in-law ǃHãunu fought an epic battle in the east using thunder and lightning, producing mountainous clouds and rain. The conflict was fought over ǂKá̦gára's returning his younger sister, ǃHãunu's wife, to their parents.

ASCII approximations of the names are =Ka'gara and !Haunu.

Orbit and occultations 

ǂKá̦gára is a cold classical Kuiper belt object. It orbits the Sun at a distance of 44 AU once every 290 years. Its orbit has an eccentricity of 0.09 and an inclination of 3 degrees with respect to the ecliptic.

If the two bodies are spheres with equal density, then mutual occultation events between ǂKá̦gára and its satellite ǃHãunu should have begun in 2015 and should continue until 2035. When ǂKá̦gára passes in front of ǃHãunu, events may last as long as 8 hours, but when ǃHãunu passes in front of ǂKá̦gára they are expected to last as long as 2 days. These latter events are only expected to occur from 2022 to 2027.

Formation 
Prograde orbits dominate tight binary systems such as 469705 ǂKá̦gára, those with satellite semimajor axes less than about 5% of their Hill radii. Grundy et al. suggest that this could be "the signature of planetesimal formation through gravitational collapse of local density enhancements such as caused by the streaming instability", which has been suggested as the formative mechanism of the only visited planetesimal, 486958 Arrokoth.

Satellite, size and mass 

469705 ǂKá̦gára has one known satellite, ǃHãunu. The magnitude difference between ǂKá̦gára and ǃHãunu is  mag. This corresponds to a difference in diameter of 13%, if the two bodies have the same albedo.

This does not particularly constrain the composition of the bodies, as the error bars cover the densities of both small, porous bodies and larger, collapsed bodies.

Notes

References

External links 
 Asteroids with Satellites, Johnston's Archive
 List of Known Trans-Neptunian Objects, Johnston's Archive
 List of Transneptunian Objects, Minor Planet Center
 
 

469705
Discoveries by Marc Buie
Named minor planets
Binary trans-Neptunian objects
20050311